Discordia evulsa is a species of snout moth in the genus Discordia. It was described by Charles Swinhoe in 1885 and is found in India.

References

Moths described in 1885
Pyralinae